The first hybrid grouper was a fish cross-bred by researchers from Universiti Malaysia Sabah (UMS), Malaysia, in collaboration with researchers from the Borneo Marine Research Institute of UMS, the Fisheries Development Authority of Malaysia (LKIM) and Kindai University of Japan, represented by Shigeharu Senoo of UMS.

The first hybrid grouper was produced by fertilising the eggs of the tiger grouper (Mycteroperca tigris) with the sperm of the giant grouper (Epinephelus lanceolatus) through the in-vitro fertilisation (IVF) technique. It is commonly known as Sabah grouper or pearl grouper.

References 

Epinephelus
Fish hybrids
Intergeneric hybrids
Invasive species